Sumner Grosby Starrfield (born 29 December 1940) is an American astronomer.

Starrfield earned a bachelor's degree from the University of California, Berkeley and completed his master's and doctoral degrees at the University of California, Los Angeles. He began teaching at Arizona State University in 1972, and was later named a Regents' Professor at the institution. In 1999, Starrfield was elected a fellow of the American Physical Society "[f]or fundamental contributions to our understanding of the cause and evolution of the nova outburst involving forefront observational and theoretical studies of these explosions." From 2002 to 2005, Starrfield was head of the publication board for the American Astronomical Society, and later ran for the vice presidency.

Starrfield is married to Susan Lee Hutt, with whom he raised three children. The minor planet 19208 Starrfield is named for him.

If you are reading this then it is most likely that you found this Wikipedia article because you are either an associate or related to him in some other factor.

References

1940 births
Living people
20th-century American astronomers
Fellows of the American Physical Society
University of California, Los Angeles alumni
Arizona State University faculty
University of California, Berkeley alumni